The men's tandem cycling event at the 1932 Summer Olympics.  The format was a sprint of 2000 metres.

Results

Winner of each of the two heats and the top two pairs in the repechage advanced to semifinal.

Heats
Heat one

Heat two

Repechage

Winner of each of the two heats advanced to the final round.

Semifinal

Heat one

Heat two

Final
Match 1/2

No 3/4 race was run DEN was awarded bronze

Key: DQ = disqualified; WO = walkover

References

Track cycling at the 1932 Summer Olympics
Cycling at the Summer Olympics – Men's tandem